Ziaja is a surname. Notable people with the surname include:

Anna Ziaja (born 1954), Polish painter and print maker
Ernest Ziaja (1919–1997), Polish ice hockey player
Wally Ziaja (born 1949), American soccer player
Witold Ziaja (born 1940), Polish field hockey player